The 1907–08 season was the 13th competitive season in Belgian football.

Overview
In order to increase the number of clubs in the first division, no club was relegated at the end of the season and two clubs qualified from the second division, namely RC Gantois and ESC de Bruxelles.

National team

* Belgium score given first

Key
 H = Home match
 A = Away match
 F = Friendly
 o.g. = own goal

Honours

Final league tables

Division I

Promotion
In the first stage, 4 provincial leagues were played, with the top two teams of each league qualifying for the final round:
 For Antwerp, Antwerp Football Alliance (winner) and RC de Malines (runner-up)
 For Liège, Standard FC Liégeois (winner) and CS Verviétois (runner-up, and relegated last season)
 For West and East Flanders, AA La Gantoise (winner) and RC de Gand (runner-up)
 For Brabant, ESC de Bruxelles (winner) and Daring Club de Bruxelles II (runner-up)

Play-off

|}

External links
Belgian clubs history

References